Cap Run is a stream in the U.S. state of West Virginia.

Cap Run was so named on account of there being a war bonnet discovered along its course.

See also
List of rivers of West Virginia

References

Rivers of Lewis County, West Virginia
Rivers of West Virginia